Dipboye Cirque is a cirque on the south side of the Olympus Range between Apollo Peak and Mount Electra in the McMurdo Dry Valleys. The cirque opens south to the Labyrinth. It was named by the Advisory Committee on Antarctic Names (2004) after Richard L. Dipboye, PHI helicopter pilot with the United States Antarctic Program in eight consecutive field seasons from 1996–2003.

References 

Cirques of Antarctica
Landforms of Victoria Land
McMurdo Dry Valleys